Frank Welsh (born 1931) is a historian, novelist and former international banker.

He graduated from Magdalene College, Cambridge, and retired after a successful banking career. He has written extensively on imperial British history, notably Hong Kong, Australia and South Africa.

Bibliography 
The History of the World: from the Dawn of Humanity to the modern age., London: Quercus, 2013.
The Battle for Christendom: The Council of Constance, 1415, and the Struggle to Unite Against Islam, London: Constable, 2008.
Great Southern Land: A New History of Australia, London : Allen Lane, 2004.
The Four Nations: A History of the United Kingdom, London: HarperCollins, 2002.
Dangerous Deceits: The Secrets of Apartheid's Corrupt Bankers, London : HarperCollins, 1999.
South Africa: A Narrative History, New York: Kodansha America, 1999.
A History of South Africa, London : HarperCollins, 1998.
The Companion Guide to the Lake District, London: Companion Guides, 1997.
A Borrowed Place: The History of Hong Kong, New York: Kodansha America, 1993.
A History of Hong Kong, London: HarperCollins, 1993.
Building a Trireme, London: Constable, 1988. - on the construction of the Olympias
Uneasy City: An Insider's View of the City of London, London: Weidenfeld & Nicolson, 1986.
Bend'Or, Duke of Westminster : A Personal Memoir, London: Robin Clark, 1985; with a foreword by  Anne Grosvenor, Duchess of Westminster, authored with George Ridley.
First blood: Tales of Horror from the Border Country, London : Constable, 1985.
The Afflicted State: A Survey of Public Enterprise, London: Century Pub., 1983.
The Profit of the State: Nationalised Industries and Public Enterprises, London: Temple Smith, 1982.

References

English historians
1931 births
Alumni of Magdalene College, Cambridge
Living people
Historians of Australia
Historians of the British Empire
Historians of the United Kingdom